Cabela's Deer Hunt: 2004 Season is the first video game to be released in the Deer Hunt series. It was developed by Sand Grain Studios and Fun Labs and was released on August 26, 2003. There was a Playstation 2 Greatest Hits release of the same game called Cabela's Deer Hunt: Season Opener.

The game was published by Activision in conjunction with hunting supply company Cabela's.

Gameplay 
As its name states, the game mostly revolves around hunting down and killing different species of deer in large, mountainous environments. There are several ways to hunt down the deer, including using a tree stand and waiting for them, tracking it down by examining its footprints, and by using callers and feeders to lure them to the player.

References

External links 

2003 video games
PlayStation 2 games
Xbox games
Activision games
Cabela's video games
Video games developed in Romania
Fun Labs games
Sand Grain Studios games